The 2011 All-Ireland Minor Camogie Championship is an inter-county competition for age graded development squad county teams in the women's team field sport of camogie was won by Tipperary, who defeated Kilkenny after staging a stunning comeback in the final, played at Semple Stadium Thurles.

Arrangements
In the semi-finals Tipperary defeated Clare at Kilmallock, 3–9 to 1–14, and Kilkenny defeated Galway 3–16 to 3–9 at Nenagh.

The Final
Nicole Walsh's pointed free two minutes from the end of normal time sealed a Tipperary comeback as they overturned a nine-point interval deficit, 2–6 to 1–0, to win the championship at Semple Stadium.
Tipperary got off to a brilliant start with a fourth-minute goal by Sarah Fryday but failed to score for the remainder of the half as Kilkenny dominated .
Points from Claire Phelan, Orla Hanrick and Aisling Curtis had the teams level by the time Phelan goaled in the 11th minute after Lydia Fitzpatrick split the Tipperary defence open with a blistering run.
With Grace Walsh dominant at centre-back and a strong wind in their favour, Miriam Walsh and Curtis added points for Kilkenny and Hanrick scored a goal on the stroke of half time to put Kilkenny in a commanding position at half time, leading by 2–6 to 1–0.
Tipperary had already made two changes by that stage and the introduction of Anne Eviston helped reshape the game, as the Drom & Inch player went on to give a performance that earned her the player of the match award.
Tipperary started the second half in similar fashion to the first, with Fryday scoring a goal three minutes after the resumption. Brid Quinn landed a point before Michaela Graham reacted quickest when Áine Kinsella batted out a Walsh free to bury the sliotar to the net.
When Tara Kennedy scored a point soon after, the margin was down to the minimum entering the final quarter.
Fitzpatrick showed good nerve to convert a Kilkenny 45 and a free to stretch the lead to three points once again.
Crucially though, Walsh restored parity with a 52nd-minute goal. Kilkenny's Emma Kavanagh and Tipperary's Alice Fogarty exchanged scores before Walsh came up trumps to clinch the title..

B Division
The Minor B final was won by Limerick who defeated Antrim in the final by eight points at De la Salle, Gracedieu. Limerick defeated Wexford in the semi-final at De la Salle, Gracedieu 2–12 to 1–5. Antrim defeated Waterford at Trim by 4–8 to 2–7. The Minor C final was won by Armagh who defeated Meath in the final by one point, 3–5 to 1–10, the decisive score being a goal by Armagh's Eadaoin Murphy.

Final stages

References

External links
 Camogie Association

Minor
All-Ireland Minor Camogie Championship